Pkhali is a traditional Georgian dish of chopped and minced vegetables, made of cabbage, eggplant, spinach, beans, beets and combined with ground walnuts, vinegar, onions, garlic, and herbs. Pkhali is also called mkhali. The common ingredient of all variations of pkhali is pureed walnut sauce. In Georgian restaurants, pkhali is usually served in three types: spinach, beetroot and white beans.

Chicken pkhali 
Katmis mkhali is a variation on the traditional pkhali. Boiled chicken is shredded and combined with seasoned nuts along with chicken broth in order to bind. Chopped herbs are then added and the salad is chilled for 3-5 hours. The texture of the salad is similar to paste. Pkhali is generally served with lettuce and pomegranate seeds.

Gallery

References

Cuisine of Georgia (country)

External links

 Pkhali Recipe (English)